Sissy (derived from sister), also sissy baby, sissy boy, sissy man, sissy pants, etc., is a pejorative term for a boy or man who does not demonstrate masculine traits, and shows possible signs of fragility. Generally, sissy implies a lack of courage, strength, athleticism, coordination, testosterone, male libido, and stoicism, all of which have typically been associated with masculinity and considered important to the male role in Western society. A man might also be considered a sissy for being interested in typically feminine hobbies or employment (e.g., being fond of fashion), displaying effeminate behavior (e.g., using hair products, hydrating products, or displaying limp wrists), being unathletic or being homosexual.

Sissy is, approximately, the male converse of tomboy (a girl with masculine traits or interests), but carries more strongly negative connotations. Research published in 2015 suggests that the terms are asymmetrical in their power to stigmatize: sissy is almost always pejorative and conveys greater severity, while tomboy rarely causes as much concern but also elicits pressure to conform to social expectations. In some communities, especially ones whose members are prominently part of Generation Z, highly effeminate males are referred to as "femboys" (feminine boy), a term which aims to provide a way to refer to effeminate males without negative connotations.

Affectionate diminutive 

Sissy is also a term of endearment used as a diminutive for the female given name Cecilia. Its usage as a diminutive for Cecilia dates back to at least the late 19th century. Its usage is explicitly called out in Charles Dickens' Hard Times: For These Times (first published in 1854), and remained in common usage at least in the United States until the 1950s and 1960s , although it has since fallen out of favor (coinciding with the rise in its usage as a pejorative).

History and usage
The term sissy has historically been used among school children as a "relentlessly negative" insult, implying immaturity and gender or sexual deviance. It has been identified as sexist in guidance issued to schools in the United Kingdom and described as "just as unacceptable as racist and homophobic language." The terms gender creative, pink boy, and tomgirl have been suggested as polite alternatives. The Japanese word  (literally "beautiful youth") and the Korean word  (literally "flower boy") are also polite terms for a man or boy with gentle or feminine attributes.

The word sissy in its original meaning of "sister" entered American English around 1840-1850 and acquired its pejorative meaning around 1885–1890; the verb sissify appeared in 1900–1905. In comparison, the word tomboy is approximately three centuries older, dating to 1545–55.

By the 1930s, "there was no more damning insult than to be called a sissy" and the word was widely used by American football coaches and sports writers to disparage rival teams and encourage ferocious player behavior. The use of the word sissy was "ubiquitous" among delinquent American youth of the 1930s; the term was used to provoke boys to join gangs, demean boys who violated group norms, force compliance with the mandates of masculinity, and justify violence (including sexual violence) against younger and weaker children. Good students were taunted as sissies and clothing styles associated with higher social classes were demeaned as sissified. Among members of a Detroit, Michigan youth gang in 1938–39, sissy was "the ultimate slur" used to tease and taunt other boys, as a rationalization for violence against rivals, and as an excuse for not observing the dicta of middle-class decorum and morality.

By the late 1980s, some men began to reclaim the term sissy for themselves. The spelling variation cissy was used in British English, at least prior to the mid 1970s. In the United States, the Comedy Central television series South Park inverted its meaning in a 2014 episode titled "The Cissy", which lampooned the controversy over transgender students' use of school restrooms; in the episode, a restroom initially designated for use by transgender students is later re-designated as "the cissy bathroom" for use by transphobic cisgender students.

As threats to masculine dominance 
Sissies are sometimes perceived as threats to masculine power. For example, in 2018, official Chinese state media derided "sissy pants" young men (who use makeup, are slender, and wear androgynous clothing) as part of a "sickly" culture that threatened the future of the nation by undermining its militaristic image. In 2021, China's Ministry of Education issued guidelines for the "cultivation of students' masculinity" to "prevent the feminization of male adolescents" through sports, physical education, and "health education" in schools.

In 2021 the National Radio and Television Administration of China added a ban on "sissy men and other abnormal esthetics" to its rules using the offensive term .

In gender and LGBT studies

In his The "Sissy Boy Syndrome" and the Development of Homosexuality (1987), the sexologist Richard Green compared two groups of boys: one group was conventionally masculine; the other group, who Green called "feminine boys" and other children called "sissy", engaged in doll play and other behavior typical for girls.  In his 15-year longitudinal study, Green looked at cross-gender behavior in boys who later turned out to be transgender, or homosexual as well as a control group, and analyzed such features as interest in sports, playroom toy preferences, doll-play fantasy, physical behavior ("acting like a girl" vs rough-and-tumble play), cross-dressing, and psychological behavior, using tests, questionnaires, interviews, and follow-ups.  He also looked at the influence of parental relationships and reaction to atypical behavior.  Later follow-ups found that, ultimately,  of the feminine or "sissy" boys developed into gay or bisexual men, whereas only one of the control group did. Analysis of the nature/nurture issue was inconclusive.

The term sissyphobia denotes a negative cultural reaction against "sissy boys" thought prevalent in 1974. Sissyphobia has more recently been used in some queer studies; other authors in this latter area have proposed effeminiphobia, femiphobia, femmephobia, or effemimania as alternative terms.

Gregory M. Herek wrote that sissyphobia arises as a combination of misogyny and homophobia. Communication scholar Shinsuke Eguchi (2011) stated: The discourse of straight-acting produces and reproduces anti-femininity and homophobia (Clarkson. 2006). For example, feminine gay men are often labeled "fem," "bitchy," "pissy," "sissy," or "queen" (e.g., Christian, 2005; Clarkson, 2006; Payne,2007). They are perceived as if they perform like "women," spurring straight-acting gay men to have negative attitudes toward feminine-acting gay men (Clarkson, 2006; Payne, 2007;Ward, 2000). This is called sissyphobia (Bergling, 2001). Kimmel (1996) supports that "masculinity has been (historically) defined as the flight from women and the repudiation of femininity" (p. 123). Thus, sissyphobia plays as the communication strategy for straight-acting gay men to justify and empower their masculinity. (p. 38).

Eguchi added,  "I wonder how 'sissyphobia' particularly plays into the dynamic of domestic violence processes in the straight-acting and effeminate-acting male same-sex coupling pattern." (p. 53).

In sexual subcultures
In the BDSM practice of forced feminization, the male bottom undergoing cross-dressing may be called a sissy as a form of erotic humiliation, which may elicit guilt and/or sexual arousal.

In paraphilic infantilism, a sissy baby is a man who likes to play the role of a baby girl.

See also

 Butch and femme
 Cuckoldry as a fetish
 Effeminacy
 Feminization (activity)
 Girly girl
 Molly house
 Pinafore eroticism
 Queer heterosexuality
 Sexism
 Tomboy
 Toxic masculinity
 Trans bashing
 Transphobia

References

Sources
Random House Dictionary of the English Language - Second Edition - Unabridged, Random House, New York (1987).

Further reading
Padva, Gilad and Talmon, Miri (2008). Gotta Have An Effeminate Heart: The Politics of Effeminacy and Sissyness in a Nostalgic Israeli TV Musical. Feminist Media Studies 8(1), 69–84.
Padva, Gilad (2005). Radical Sissies and Stereotyped Fairies in Laurie Lynd's The Fairy Who Didn't Want To Be A Fairy Anymore. Cinema Journal 45(1), 66–78.
Jana Katz, Martina Kock, Sandra Ortmann, Jana Schenk and Tomka Weiss (2011). Sissy Boyz. Queer Performance. thealit FRAUEN.KULTUR.LABOR, Bremen.

External links

LGBT terminology
Male gender nonconformity
Gay effeminacy
Gender-related stereotypes
Homophobic slurs
LGBT-related slurs
Pejorative terms for men
Effeminacy
English words
Sisters